The Compound shutter is a mechanical leaf shutter for photographic cameras introduced in the late 19th century, usually used between lens components. It was produced by Friedrich Deckel AG, Munich (Germany). A typical Compound shutter may have settings for T (Time), B (Bulb), and times from 1 second down to 1/100th or less.

Unlike later mechanical shutters such as the Compur which use a clockwork mechanism, shutter timing is achieved by releasing air from a small cylinder typically mounted horizontally at the top of the shutter through a small aperture. A cam turned by the shutter speed dial positions a piston in the cylinder to provide the correct exposure. When the shutter release is pressed the shutter opens and air in the cylinder is gradually released, letting the piston move; it closes the shutter  when it reaches the end of its travel. The piston travels for a very short distance at the higher speeds, making the accuracy of these shutters very sensitive to the precise manufacturing of the cam; lower speeds are more reliably accurate.

Compound shutters were manufactured for 65 years, the last one being made in 1970.

References

Photographic shutters